Corrigan Lake, Lake Corrigan or Lac Corrigan may refer to one of the following lakes in Canada:

Ontario
Corrigan Lake (Kenora District)
Corrigan Lake (Sudbury District)
Corrigan Lake (Thunder Bay District)
Quebec
Lac Corrigan Senneterre, La Vallée-de-l'Or Regional County Municipality
Lac Corrigan in Lac-Nilgaut, Pontiac Regional County Municipality
Lac Corrigan in Val-des-Monts, Les Collines-de-l'Outaouais Regional County Municipality
Petit lac Corrigan, Sheenboro, Pontiac Regional County Municipality